Edgeworth Island is a member of the Arctic Archipelago in the territory of Nunavut. It lies north of Lyons Point, Prince of Wales Island in Peel Sound, outside the entrance of the Baring Channel. Russell Island is to the northwest.

External links 
 Edgeworth Island in the Atlas of Canada - Toporama; Natural Resources Canada

Uninhabited islands of Qikiqtaaluk Region